Samuel A. McIvor was an American politician. He served in the Georgia House of Representatives representing Liberty County, Georgia.

Early life
McIvor was one of the first African-Americans to register to vote in 1867 after the Reconstruction Act was passed.

Career

During the 1888–89 session, McIvor introduced a bill to create a state university for African Americans. In July 1889, he participated in a procession of over 200 legislators to dedicate the newly built Georgia State Capitol. He was the only Black person in the entire procession.

References

African-American men in politics
Republican Party members of the Georgia House of Representatives
19th-century African-American politicians
19th-century American politicians
People from Liberty County, Georgia
Republican Party (United States) politicians
African-American state legislators in Georgia (U.S. state)
Year of birth missing
Year of death missing